Tlaloc may refer to:

 Tlaloc, a fictional character from the Legends of Dune books
 Mount Tlaloc, a mountain and archaeological site in central Mexico
 Tlaloc (fish), Genus of fish
 Tlaloc Rivas, a Mexican-American writer